William Baird may refer to:

 William Baird (MP) (1796–1864), Conservative MP for Falkirk Burghs
 William Baird (physician) (1803–1872), Scottish physician and zoologist
 William Baird (footballer) (1874–?), Scottish footballer
 William Alexander Baird (1867–1940), Ontario lawyer and politician
 William L. Baird (1843–1916), Massachusetts politician
 William M. Baird (1862–1931), American Presbyterian missionary
 William Raimond Baird (1848–1917), publisher of Baird's Manual of American College Fraternities
 William Teel Baird (1819–1897), New Brunswick historian

See also
 Baird baronets
Bill Baird (disambiguation)